This is a list of past elections in the U.S. state of Tennessee. Tennessee's politics are currently dominated by the Republican Party. Republicans currently hold both of the state's U.S. Senate seats, a majority of Congressional seats, and the state legislature. Democratic strength is largely concentrated in Nashville, Memphis, and parts of Knoxville, Chattanooga, and Clarksville. Several sunburn areas of Nashville and Memphis also contain significant Democratic minorities. Tennessee is one of thirteen states which holds its presidential primaries on Super Tuesday. Tennessee does not require voters to declare a party affiliation when registering. The state is one of eight states which require voters to present a form of photo identification.

Between the end of the Civil War and the mid-20th century, Tennessee was part of the Democratic Solid South, but had the largest Republican minority of any former Confederate state. During this time, East Tennessee was heavily Republican and the western two thirds mostly voted Democratic, with the latter dominating the state. This division was related to the state's pattern of Unionist and Confederate loyalism during the Civil War.

Presidential

United States presidential election in Tennessee, 1824
United States presidential election in Tennessee, 1828
United States presidential election in Tennessee, 1832
United States presidential election in Tennessee, 1836
United States presidential election in Tennessee, 1840
United States presidential election in Tennessee, 1844
United States presidential election in Tennessee, 1944
United States presidential election in Tennessee, 1948
United States presidential election in Tennessee, 1952
United States presidential election in Tennessee, 1956
United States presidential election in Tennessee, 1960
United States presidential election in Tennessee, 1964
United States presidential election in Tennessee, 1968
United States presidential election in Tennessee, 1972
United States presidential election in Tennessee, 1976
United States presidential election in Tennessee, 1980
United States presidential election in Tennessee, 1984
United States presidential election in Tennessee, 1988
United States presidential election in Tennessee, 1992
United States presidential election in Tennessee, 1996
United States presidential election in Tennessee, 2000
United States presidential election in Tennessee, 2004
United States presidential election in Tennessee, 2008
United States presidential election in Tennessee, 2012
United States presidential election in Tennessee, 2016
United States presidential election in Tennessee, 2020

National legislative elections

House of Representatives elections
2006 United States House of Representatives elections in Tennessee
2008 United States House of Representatives elections in Tennessee
2010 United States House of Representatives elections in Tennessee
2012 United States House of Representatives elections in Tennessee
2014 United States House of Representatives elections in Tennessee
2016 United States House of Representatives elections in Tennessee
2018 United States House of Representatives elections in Tennessee
2020 United States House of Representatives elections in Tennessee
2022 United States House of Representatives elections in Tennessee
2024 United States House of Representatives elections in Tennessee

Senate elections
United States Senate election in Tennessee, 1970
United States Senate election in Tennessee, 1976
United States Senate election in Tennessee, 1978
United States Senate election in Tennessee, 1984
United States Senate election in Tennessee, 1988
United States Senate election in Tennessee, 1990
United States Senate special election in Tennessee, 1994
United States Senate election in Tennessee, 1994
United States Senate election in Tennessee, 1996
United States Senate election in Tennessee, 2000
United States Senate election in Tennessee, 2002
United States Senate election in Tennessee, 2006
United States Senate election in Tennessee, 2008
United States Senate election in Tennessee, 2012
United States Senate election in Tennessee, 2014
United States Senate election in Tennessee, 2018
United States Senate election in Tennessee, 2020

Gubernatorial elections

1799 Tennessee gubernatorial election
1801 Tennessee gubernatorial election
1803 Tennessee gubernatorial election
1805 Tennessee gubernatorial election
1807 Tennessee gubernatorial election
1952 Tennessee gubernatorial election
1954 Tennessee gubernatorial election
1958 Tennessee gubernatorial election
1962 Tennessee gubernatorial election
1966 Tennessee gubernatorial election
1970 Tennessee gubernatorial election
1974 Tennessee gubernatorial election
1978 Tennessee gubernatorial election
1982 Tennessee gubernatorial election
1986 Tennessee gubernatorial election
1990 Tennessee gubernatorial election
1994 Tennessee gubernatorial election
1994 Tennessee gubernatorial election
1998 Tennessee gubernatorial election
2002 Tennessee gubernatorial election
2006 Tennessee gubernatorial election
2010 Tennessee gubernatorial election
2014 Tennessee gubernatorial election
2018 Tennessee gubernatorial election
2022 Tennessee gubernatorial election

State legislative elections
 2020 Tennessee Senate election
 2020 Tennessee House of Representatives election
 2022 Tennessee Senate election
 2022 Tennessee House of Representatives election

Mayoral elections
Chattanooga
2021 Chattanooga mayoral election
Clarksville
2022 Clarksville mayoral election
Knoxville
2023 Knoxville mayoral election
Memphis
2023 Memphis mayoral election
Nashville 
2023 Nashville mayoral election

Other
Tennessee Marriage Protection Amendment

See also
Political party strength in Tennessee
Politics in Tennessee
List of United States senators from Tennessee
List of United States representatives from Tennessee
Tennessee Senate
Tennessee House of Representatives

References

Works cited

External links

 
 
  (State affiliate of the U.S. League of Women Voters)
 

 
Government of Tennessee
Political events in Tennessee